Overlay transport virtualization (OTV) is a Cisco proprietary protocol for relaying layer 2 communications between layer 3 computer networks.

See also 
 Distributed Overlay Virtual Ethernet (DOVE)
 Generic Routing Encapsulation (GRE)
 IEEE 802.1ad, an Ethernet networking standard, also known as provider bridging, Stacked VLANs, or simply QinQ.
 NVGRE, a similar competing specification
 Virtual Extensible LAN (VXLAN)
 Virtual LAN (VLAN)

External links 
 Cisco Overlay Transport Virtualization overview

Network protocols
Tunneling protocols